HCO may refer to:

In arts and entertainment
 Hobart Chamber Orchestra
 Hollywood Chamber Orchestra

In science and technology
 Aldehyde (HCO-)
 Harvard College Observatory
 Hearing carry over, a type of telecommunications relay service
 Heliocentric orbit, an orbit around the Sun
 Holocene climatic optimum

Businesses and organizations
 Handball Club Odense, a Danish handball club 
 Hans Christian Ørsted Institute (HCØ)
 Hollister Co., an American lifestyle brand
 National Socialist Society
 Hanwell Community Observatory, a public outreach astronomy organisation; see Hanwell, Oxfordshire
 Hubbard Communications Office, an organization in the Church of Scientology
 Health Care Organization

Other
 The Hong Kong High Court Ordinance.